Whispers of the Vampire's Blade is an adventure module for the 3.5 edition of the Dungeons & Dragons fantasy role-playing game.

Plot summary
Whispers of the Vampire's Blade takes place in the Eberron setting. A Brelish spy flees across Khorvaire with a powerful stolen magic sword, while operatives from multiple other factions pursue him.

Publication history
Whispers of the Vampire's Blade was written by David Noonan, and was published in September 2004. Cover art was by Wayne Reynolds, with interior art by Steve Prescott.

Reception
Dungeon Master for Dummies lists Whispers of the Vampire's Blade as one of the ten best 3rd edition adventures.

References

External links
 product info

Eberron adventures
Role-playing game supplements introduced in 2004